Rashida Sultana Emily is a Bangladeshi retired District and Sessions judge and one of the four incumbent Election Commissioners of Bangladesh.

Early life 
Emily was born in Sirajganj District.

Career 
Emily joined the judicial service of Bangladesh Civil Service in 1985.

Emily retired in 2020 as the Rangpur District judge. She had previously served in Gaibandha District.

On 26 February 2022, Emily was appointed an Election Commissioner of Bangladesh.

References 

Living people
Election Commissioners of Bangladesh
People from Sirajganj District
Year of birth missing (living people)